Middelburger See is a lake in Süsel, Kreis Ostholstein, Schleswig-Holstein, Germany.

Lakes of Schleswig-Holstein
Nature reserves in Schleswig-Holstein
LMiddelburgerSee